Concerto in "B Goode" is the thirteenth studio album by Chuck Berry, released in 1969 by Mercury Records. The title song is an extended instrumental interpolation of a wide range of themes pioneered in Berry's classic 1957-62 period, running approximately 18 minutes and taking up the entire second side of the record; this is Berry embracing the emerging preference in the rock genre for extended numbers. The title refers to Berry's semi-autobiographical song "Johnny B. Goode."

In his Rolling Stone review, Lester Bangs hailed this as a real return to form:  "The Master is back again, and this time he has come up with a record worthy of his reputation."

This was the last album from Berry's brief association with Mercury. The next year, he moved back to Chess Records, for which his earlier recordings had been made.

Track listing

Personnel

Musicians
 Chuck Berry – guitar,  vocals
 Kermit Eugene Cooley – bass guitar
 Dale Grischer – drums
 Billy Peek – guitar, harmonica, keyboard, tambourine

Technical
 Chuck Berry – producer
 Dennis Drake – mastering
 Richard Lochte – liner notes

References

External links

Chuck Berry albums
1969 albums
Mercury Records albums
Albums produced by Chuck Berry